Esma Ellen Charlotte Littmann (née Cannon; 27 December 1905 – 18 October 1972), credited as Esme or Esma Cannon, was a diminutive [] Australian-born character actress and comedian, who moved to Britain in the early 1930s. Although she frequently appeared on television in her latter years, Cannon is best remembered as a film actress, with a lengthy career in British productions from the 1930s to the 1960s.

Career
After early experience at Minnie Everett's School of Dancing in Sydney, Cannon began acting on the stage at the age of four in Madama Butterfly. She appeared in productions for both the J. C. Williamson and Tait companies – including the early prominent role of Ruth Le Page in Sealed Orders at the Theatre Royal in 1914, and played Baby in an adaptation of Seven Little Australians the same year. She was given children's parts well into adulthood. In an interview with the Australian Women's Weekly published in 1963, she claimed it was the theatrical impresario Percy Hutchinson who told her if she visited London he would give her work; her first London role was in the play Misadventure.

She worked not only as an actress in Britain in the 1930s but also in stage management and production.

Her film début was an uncredited part in The Man Behind the Mask (1936). She was first credited, as Polly Shepherd, in The Last Adventurers (1937), and appeared in 64 films over the next 26 years. She had small parts in three early Powell and Pressburger films: The Spy in Black (1939), Contraband (1940) and A Canterbury Tale (1944). Apart from her usual comedy roles, she gave two dramatic performances, the first in Holiday Camp (1947), playing a pathetic spinster who is lured to her death as a murder victim, and the other as a girl struck dumb by terror, alongside Margaret Lockwood in Jassy (also 1947).

Towards the end of her career, she appeared in Inn for Trouble (1960), Doctor in Love (1960), Raising the Wind (1961), What a Carve Up! (1961), Over the Odds (1961), We Joined the Navy (1962), On the Beat (1962), Nurse on Wheels (1963) and Hide and Seek (1964). She was cast as Edie Hornett opposite Peggy Mount in the comedy Sailor Beware! (1956). She played "Brother" Lil in the British television comedy series The Rag Trade (1961–1963), and also appeared in four Carry On films: Carry On Constable (1960), Carry On Regardless (1961), Carry On Cruising (1962) and Carry On Cabby (1963).

Retirement and death
Cannon married Ernst Littmann in London in 1945. They remained married until her death in 1972.

Cannon, whose first name sometimes appears incorrectly as "Esme", retired in 1964 after Hide and Seek. She died in 1972 at the age of 66 and is buried at Saint-Benoît-la-Forêt in France. Her elusiveness was such that her former colleagues and friends discovered she had died only after a "Where are They Now?" feature appeared in Films and Filming a number of years after her death. 

She was played by the actress Marcia Warren in the 2011 TV play Hattie, a drama based on the career of Hattie Jacques. The play featured a number of scenes with the two actresses on the set of Carry On Cabby (her antepenultimate role) with Cannon characterised as being disenchanted with acting and proposing leaving show business.

Selected filmography

 The Man Behind the Mask (1936) – Waitress (uncredited)
 The Five Pound Man (1937) – Lucy
 Cotton Queen (1937) – Telephonist (uncredited)
 The Last Adventurers (1937) – Polly Shepherd
 I See Ice (1938) – Bride (uncredited)
 It's in the Air (1938) – Sir Philip's Maid (uncredited)
 Trouble Brewing (1939) – Maid (uncredited)
 The Nursemaid Who Disappeared (1939) – Mary – Nursemaid (uncredited)
 I Met a Murderer (1939) – Blonde Camper
 The Spy in Black (1939) – Maggie (uncredited)
 Poison Pen (1939) – Mrs Warren
 Contraband (1940) – Erik Skold's Niece (uncredited)
 The Briggs Family (1940) – Myrtle
 Quiet Wedding (1941) – (uncredited)
 Asking for Trouble (1942) – Ada
 The Young Mr. Pitt (1942) – Servant at Lord Auckland's (uncredited)
 It's in the Bag (1944) – Commandant W.T.C. (uncredited)
 Fanny by Gaslight (1944) – Maid (uncredited)
 A Canterbury Tale (1944) – Agnes
 The Way Ahead (1944) – Mrs. Brewer
 English Without Tears (1944) – Queenie
 Don't Take It to Heart (1944) – Maid
 The Years Between (1946) – Effie
 Holiday Camp (1947) – Elsie Dawson
 Jassy (1947) – Lindy Wicks
 Here Come the Huggetts (1948) – Youth Leader
 Vote for Huggett (1949) – Bit Role (uncredited)
 The Huggetts Abroad (1949) – Miss Hawker, Brown Owl
 Fools Rush In (1949) – Mrs. Atkins
 Marry Me! (1949) – Pleasant Little Woman (uncredited)
 Helter Skelter (1949) – Autograph Huntress (uncredited)
 Guilt Is My Shadow (1950) – Peggy
 Double Confession (1950) – Madam Cleo
 Last Holiday (1950) – Miss Fox
 Crow Hollow (1952) – Aunt Judith
 Noose for a Lady (1953) – Miss Ginch
 The Steel Key (1953) – Patient in Doctor's Waiting Room
 Trouble in Store (1953) – Lady Customer In Park Cafe (uncredited)
 The Sleeping Tiger (1954) – Cleaner with ladder
 Out of the Clouds (1955) – Her Companion
 Simon and Laura (1955) – Laura from Newcastle
 Sailor Beware! (1956) – Edie Hornett
 Three Men in a Boat (1956) – Meek Woman (Maze)
 A Touch of the Sun (1956) Miss Tickle
 Further Up the Creek (1958) – Maudie Lovelace
 Jack the Ripper (1959) – Nelly the Woman at Police Station
 I'm All Right Jack (1959) – Spencer
 Expresso Bongo (1959) – Night Club Cleaner (uncredited)
 Inn for Trouble (1960) – Dolly
 The Flesh and the Fiends (1960) – Aggie
 Carry On Constable (1960) – Deaf Old Lady
 Doctor in Love (1960) – Rafia Woman (uncredited)
 No Kidding (1960) – District Nurse
 Carry On Regardless (1961) – Miss Cooling
 Raising the Wind (1961) – Mrs. Deevens
 What a Carve Up! (1961) – Aunt Emily
 Over the Odds (1961) – Alice
 Carry On Cruising (1962) – Bridget Madderley
 In the Doghouse (1961) – Mrs. Raikes
 We Joined the Navy (1962) – Consul's Wife
 The Fast Lady (1962) – Lady on Zebra Crossing
 On the Beat (1962) – Mrs. Timms
 Nurse on Wheels (1963) – Mrs. Jones
 Carry On Cabby (1963) – Flo Sims
 Hide and Seek (1964) – Tea Lady (final film role)

References

External links

1905 births
1972 deaths
Actresses from Sydney
Australian film actresses
Australian television actresses
Australian emigrants to England
British film actresses
British television actresses
20th-century British actresses